Mwanza is a district in the Southern Region of Malawi. The capital is Mwanza. The district covers an area of 2,259 km² and has a population of 138,015.

Mwanza is a border town whose economy is based largely on transport. The agricultural economy for many years has depended upon citrus fruits (tangerine, lemon and grapefruit) as Mwanza is one of the few areas of the country where the climate is favourable for the growth of such crops. However, for over a decade production has been falling and the citrus industry has been in decline, despite efforts by the citrus growers association ZIPATSO.

Mwanza in 2003 was split into two districts, Neno and Mwanza, under the decentralisation program. Neno's population is 75,000.

Demographics
At the time of the 2018 Census of Malawi, the distribution of the population of Mwanza District by ethnic group was as follows:
 59.3% Chewa
 30.4% Ngoni
 4.2% Lomwe
 2.3% Mang'anja
 1.4% Yao
 1.1% Sena
 0.5% Tumbuka
 0.1% Tonga
 0.1% Nyanja
 0.1% Nkhonde
 0.0% Lambya
 0.0% Sukwa
 0.5% Others

Government and administrative divisions

There are two National Assembly constituencies in Mwanza:

 Mwanza - Central
 Mwanza - West

Since the 2009 election both constituencies have been held by members of the Democratic Progressive Party.

References

Districts of Malawi
Districts in Southern Region, Malawi